Delazon Smith (October 5, 1816November 19, 1860) was a Democratic Party politician who briefly represented the state of Oregon in the U.S. Senate in 1859. He served for less than one month (February 14 to March 3), making his term among the shortest on record in the Senate. Smith was also a newspaper editor in New York and Ohio, and served in the Oregon Territory's legislature.

According to the obituary in the Chicago Tribune, "The adventurous character of Mr. Smith, and the noted eccentricity of his career, had given him a notoriety greater than is usual to men of a similar grade of ability and attainment."

Early life
Smith was born in New Berlin, New York on October 5, 1816. He was expelled from Oberlin College in Ohio in 1837, and excommunicated from "the church". He then began the study of law. and soon was admitted to the bar. In 1838 he established the New York Watchman newspaper in Rochester, New York, which he edited for two years. Smith also edited the True Jeffersonian and the Western Herald in Rochester for a time in 1840. In 1841, he founded the Western Empire in Dayton, Ohio.

Anti-abolitionist
Like most Democrats at the time, Delazon was opposed to the abolition of American slavery, and in particular to the warm treatment blacks received in Oberlin.

Politics
Smith's career in politics began when he was appointed a special United States commissioner to Quito, Ecuador, serving in this capacity from 1842 to 1845. He then moved to the Iowa Territory in 1846 and became a minister. In 1850, he ran in the Iowa 1st district special election as an Independent receiving 3.43% of the vote. In 1852 he moved to the Oregon Territory and began editing the Oregon Democrat. In 1854 he was elected to the Territorial House of Representatives. There he served as Speaker of the House during the 1855 to 1856 session. The following session was his last as a representative of Linn County. In 1857 Smith was a delegate to the state's constitutional convention of that prepared the first constitution in preparation for statehood. Upon Oregon's admission to the Union as the 33rd state, Smith was elected to the Senate, serving from February 14 to March 4, 1859. He was an unsuccessful candidate for re-election.

Less than two years after leaving the Senate, Delazon Smith died in Portland on November 19, 1860, at the age of 44 years. His interment was at Albany, Oregon in the Masonic Cemetery.

Works authored
A History of Oberlin, or New Lights of the West. Cleveland, 1837.

References

|-

1816 births
1860 deaths
19th-century American businesspeople
19th-century American journalists
19th-century American male writers
19th-century American politicians
American male journalists
American newspaper editors
American newspaper founders
American proslavery activists
Democratic Party United States senators from Oregon
Journalists from Ohio
Members of the Oregon Constitutional Convention
Members of the Oregon Territorial Legislature
Oberlin College alumni
People from Albany, Oregon
People from New Berlin, New York
Politicians from Dayton, Ohio